Pyropteron triannuliformis is a moth of the family Sesiidae. It is found from most of Europe (except Ireland, Great Britain, the Iberian Peninsula, the Benelux, Denmark and Fennoscandia) to the Near East and Central Asia.

The wingspan is 14–20 mm. Adults are on wing in June and July.

The larvae feed on the roots of Rumex species (including Rumex acetosella, Rumex acetosa, Rumex crispus, Rumex palustris and Rumex conglomeratus) as well as Geranium sanguineum.

References

Moths described in 1843
Sesiidae
Moths of Europe
Moths of Asia